Mitzi Montoya is Senior Vice President for Academic Affairs at the University of Utah, a researcher on innovation in education, and a public advocate for women in leadership.

Early life and education 

Mitzi Montoya was born in Fort Worth, Texas and subsequently lived in Colorado, California, South Carolina, and Michigan. She holds a bachelor’s degree in applied engineering science from Michigan State University (1990) and worked as a design engineer before pursuing as a Ph.D. in marketing and statistics from Michigan State, which she completed in 1995.

Academic career 

After her PhD, Montoya spent 15 years at North Carolina State University, 1995-2010, first as a professor and then as assistant dean. Montoya's scholarship focuses on product design optimization and advanced information technologies used in marketing and new product development. Widely cited publications include:

 Determinants of new product performance: A review and meta-analysis (Mitzi Montoya and Roger Calantone), 1994
 The effect of perceived technological uncertainty on Japanese new product development (Michael Song and Mitzi Montoya)
 "Do I Really Have To? User Acceptance of Mandated Technology" (2002)

Leadership positions 

Prior to joining the University of Utah, Montoya served as Dean and professor of the Anderson School of Management at the University of New Mexico (July 2020-January 2023). From 2019-2020 she served as executive vice president and professor, Washington State University; from 2015-2019 she was senior administrator, executive dean and professor, Oregon State University; from 2010-2015 she was executive dean, vice provost, vice president and professor, Arizona State University.

References 

Living people
Michigan State University alumni
North Carolina State University faculty
University of New Mexico faculty
Washington State University faculty
Oregon State University faculty
Arizona State University faculty
University of Utah faculty
Year of birth missing (living people)